Lillian Glass is an American interpersonal communication and body language expert, media commentator, a litigation consultant, and author of self-help books. She is also a film director and producer.

Education
Glass graduated from Coral Gables High School.

Glass received a Bachelor of Science degree from Bradley University in Speech and Hearing Sciences, where she was named one of Glamour Magazine'''s Top 10 College Women. She earned her Master of Science degree from the University of Michigan, where she became interested in gender differences in communication and the study of cranial and dental- facial abnormalities.

She received a doctorate degree from the University of Minnesota and was awarded a Bush Foundation fellowship. She majored in communication disorders, with an emphasis on speech and hearing sciences, and minored in clinical genetics. Her doctoral dissertation focused on Psychosocial Perceptions of Speech and Cosmetic Appearance of Patients with Craniofacial Abnormalities.

She received a post-doctorate in Medical Genetics at UCLA School of Medicine, where she received a National Institutes of Health (NIH) Grant and did research on speech and hearing problems of patients with a variety of genetic diseases, including those with neurological and skeletal problems. Glass has published in various professional journals, including the New England Journal of Medicine . She also discovered a genetic syndrome involving deafness and a dental abnormality, described as the Glass-Gorlin Syndrome (oligodontia and sensorineural deafness).

In 2013, Glass attended Pepperdine University's School of Law Straus Institute for Dispute Resolution, where she studied mediation.

Career

Academics
Upon completing her postdoctoral training at UCLA School of Medicine, Glass became an associate professor at the University of Southern California (USC). She held joint appointments with the School of Medicine,   Department of Medical Genetics, School of Dentistry, and Department of Speech Communication and was a researcher at the University of Southern California Speech Research Lab.

Private practice
Glass began her private practice in Beverly Hills, California, treating patients with speech and hearing difficulties. Her practice progressed to training actors for movie roles. One of her first clients include Dustin Hoffman. and Sean Connery. She also coached deaf actress Marlee Matlin, in speaking publicly at the Academy Award ceremonies and in film roles, and Rob Pilatus and Fabrice Morvan.  Caitlyn Jenner also worked with Glass to learn how to feminize her voice and body language as she transitioned from being Bruce Jenner.

Glass has lectured on the topic of communication and body language.

Media
Glass began her television career as a co-host on Alive and Well on USA Network and as a psychology reporter for the ABC affiliate in Los Angeles, KABC Television. She has since appeared on a variety of news and talk shows, including Good Morning America and the Today show. In addition, she has often appeared on various news shows discussing the body language and communication patterns of newsmakers.  She has appeared as a body language expert on HLN's Nancy Grace Show,  MSNBC,  Entertainment Tonight, and others and 20/20. Finally, she has appeared on numerous reality shows,YouTube: Busted and Disgusted and was the body language expert on Season 8 of Dancing With the Stars, BRAVO's Millionaire Matchmaker, and Swift Justice. She has also appeared on ′′ National Geographic's ′′Brain Games and on Dr. Phil.

Glass has written a monthly body language column for Cosmopolitan.

Along with her "Dr. Lillian Glass Body Language Blog'", Glass also writes about celebrities and newsmakers in her blog, Reading People, for Psychology Today. She has also been a contributor to Women in Crime Ink.

Legal Consultant
Glass has provided expert testimony regarding body language, speech, and vocal forensics and behavioral analysis. She has been retained by attorneys as an expert witness, jury/litigation consultant, doing jury selection and witness preparation. Glass has been a  member of the American Society of Trial Consultants and a member of the Pro Bono Committee of the ASTC which provides free jury and trial consulting for pro bono groups.

Film career
In 2016 Lillian Glass began a film career as a director and producer. Her first film is the documentary Reinventing Rosalee.

Honors and awards
She was selected as "Outstanding Young Graduate" by Bradley University and inducted into membership into their highest alumni honor society, "The Centurion Society".
 
Glass was also honored by Glamour Magazine as one of 10 "Outstanding Young Working Women" and  also selected as one of the nation's nine "Successful Business Women."

In her film career Glass has won numerous film awards for "Best Director", "Best Female Director" and "Best Documentary" for her film "Reinventing Rosalee' in various film festivals throughout the world.

Noise Pollution Awareness Advocacy
As a USC professor, Glass helped create public awareness via a media campaign, to warn the public against the dangers of  noise pollution.  She, along with a group of celebrities also advocated the building of acoustical or noise barriers to help mitigate noise pollution in Los Angeles. She was also on the Board of Directors of a consumer advocacy group established by the American Speech-Language and Hearing Association to help create awareness with regard to noise pollution.

Controversy

Copyright Infringement of Glass's Toxic People Book 
In 2010, Glass won a jury verdict in US Federal Court for copyright infringement against Marsha Petrie Sue for having published in 2007 a book entitled Toxic People.  Glass had written a book by that same title in 1995, and the 2007 book by Petrie Sue contained word-for-word copying of Glass' work.

Published works

Books
Her self-help books deal with the topics of Human Behavior, Communication Skills, and Body Language. They are published in many languages throughout the world.

Her books concerning Human Behavior include: Toxic People - 10 Ways of Dealing with People Who Make Your Life Miserable, Toxic Men - 10 ways of Identifying, Dealing With and Healing From Men Who Make Your Life Miserable, Attracting Terrific People - How to Find and Keep the People Who Bring Your Life Joy, 50 Ways My Dog Made Me Into A Better Person and The Complete Idiot's Guide to Understanding Men and Women.

Her books on Communication Skills include: Talk to Win- Six Steps to a Successful Vocal Image, Confident Conversation,  How to Deprogram Your Valley Girl, Say It Right-How to Talk In Any Social or Business Situation,  He Says She Says: Closing the Communication Gap Between the Sexes, The Complete Idiot's Guide to Verbal Self Defense and Bikram Vocal Yoga - Voice Communication and Body Language Skills to Increase Confidence and Enrich Your Life.

Her books pertaining to Body Language include: I Know What You're Thinking- Using the Four Codes of Reading People to Improve Your Life, Guide to Identifying Terrorists Through Body Language by Lillian Glass Ph.D. and former FBI Special Agent D.Vincent Sullivan, The Body Language Advantage: Maximize Your Personal and Professional Relationships with this Ultimate Photo Guide to Deciphering What Others Are Secretly Saying in Any Situation, and The Body Language of Liars- From Little White Lies to Pathological Deception - How to See through the Fibs, Frauds, and Falsehoods People Tell You Every Day''.

References

External links
Dr. Lillian Glass body language blog

Year of birth missing (living people)
Living people
American bloggers
American columnists
American television personalities
American women television personalities
Writers from Miami
University of Minnesota College of Liberal Arts alumni
University of Michigan alumni
American women columnists
American women bloggers
David Geffen School of Medicine at UCLA alumni
American women non-fiction writers
21st-century American non-fiction writers
American women film directors
21st-century American women writers